Super Cars is a top-view racing game from Gremlin Interactive, who later produced the Lotus series of games. Stylistically, the game is influenced by Super Sprint.

There are endless tracks at each of the 4 difficulty levels, which can be raced in any order (although the last track raced is made harder than usual). In the races the player wins money, which can be spent on temporary handling and power upgrades, plus armour plating and front/rear shooting missiles that can knock out other racers. The player must finish in the top 3 of each race to progress - initially there are 4 computer opponents, but more are added as the game progresses.

The car can be upgraded throughout the game via the shop section. The player is given an initial price, but also a number of options of things to say to the salesman - with the right combination, the price will drop.

The NES version was released exclusively in America in 1991 by Electro Brain.

It was followed by Super Cars II in 1991.

Cars
Three cars are available for purchase during the game, the Taraco Neoroder Turbo, the Vaug Interceptor Turbo and the Retron Parsec Turbo. Each appears to be based on a real car of the time with the Retron Parsec Turbo being based on the Cizeta-Moroder V16T, the Vaug Interceptor based on the Honda NSX and the Taraco Neoroder based on the Alfa Romeo SZ (Sprint Zagato) but with some slight changes. This is in slight contrast to the box art, where the blue "starter" car (Taraco) instead more closely resembles a contemporary European Ford Fiesta or Escort Cosworth convertible.  The Retron is also portrayed differently on the box art, where it is a Lamborghini Countach instead of a Cizeta.

External links

 Super Cars at MobyGames

1990 video games
Amiga games
Amstrad CPC games
Atari ST games
Commodore 64 games
Electro Brain games
Gremlin Interactive games
Magnetic Fields (video game developer) games
MSX games
Nintendo Entertainment System games
Single-player video games
Top-down racing video games
Video games developed in the United Kingdom
Video games scored by Barry Leitch
Video games scored by Ben Daglish
ZX Spectrum games